Rhonda Galbally AC has been a CEO, Chair and board member for over thirty years, across business and the not for profit sector, the public sector and philanthropy.

As a woman with a lifelong disability, Galbally first began focusing on disability rights and policy in the early 1980s while working as the senior policy officer for the Victorian Council for Social Services. Galbally next became the CEO of the Sidney Myer Fund and the Myer Foundation, in that role she served as Chair of the Australian Association of Philanthropy.

Galbally was appointed as the founding CEO of a number of new organisations, including the Australian Commission for the Future, the Australian International Health Institute, the Australian National Preventative Health Agency and OurCommunity Pty Ltd. Galbally established the Victorian Health Promotion Foundation (VicHealth) as the first organisation in the world to use a levy on tobacco for tobacco control, reducing demand for alcohol, tackling risk factors for heart disease, cancer and diabetes, injury prevention, sexual health and mental health promotion. Galbally was appointed as the Independent Chair of the Review of Drugs Poisons and Controlled Substances Legislation (the Galbally Review). 

Galbally chaired the Royal Women's Hospital. She was a member of the expert four-person panel that developed the Victorian Charter of Human Rights and Responsibilities.  Galbally then went on to chair the Federal Government's National People with Disability and Carers' Council.

Galbally was a board member of the National Disability Insurance Agency (NDIA) and Principal Member of the Independent Advisory Council which provided advice to the NDIA about the importance of self-determination, social and economic inclusion, peer support and contemporary living models including the right to a mainstream life for people with disabilities.

With a career spanning many decades and positions at the highest levels, Galbally considers that a highlight was developing the National Disability and Carer Alliance that brought together people with disabilities, families and carers with services to campaign for the National Disability insurance Scheme by developing the Every Australian Counts Campaign.

As a Commissioner of the Royal Commission into Violence, Abuse, Neglect and Exploitation of People with Disabilities, Galbally is keen to utilise what she has learned from her broad experience which gives her a detailed understanding of some of the major interfacing systems, including health, education, justice and housing. But most of all Galbally brings decades listening to and working shoulder-to-shoulder with people with disabilities and families in fighting for the human right to be able to live lives fully in the community, without fear of violence, abuse, neglect and exploitation.

Honours and awards 
In 1991 Galbally was appointed an Officer (AO) of the Order of Australia. She has received honorary doctorates from RMIT University in and La Trobe University, and was awarded the Centenary Medal in 2001.

In 2019 Galbally was appointed a Companion (AC) of the Order of Australia.

Published works

References

External links
www.sciencealert.com.au

The Victorian Council of Social Services (VCOSS)
Myer Foundation
National Disability Insurance Scheme
Royal Women’s Hospital
Compassionate Friends

1948 births
Living people
Officers of the Order of Australia
Companions of the Order of Australia
Australian disability rights activists